The 1995 NCAA Division I men's ice hockey tournament involved 12 schools playing in single-elimination play to determine the national champion of men's  NCAA Division I college ice hockey. It began on March 24, 1995, and ended with the championship game on April 1. A total of 11 games were played.  The top 2 seeds in each region received a bye into the tournament quarterfinals.

Qualifying teams
The at-large bids and seeding for each team in the tournament were announced after the conference tournaments concluded. The Western Collegiate Hockey Association (WCHA) had four teams receive a berth in the tournament, the Central Collegiate Hockey Association (CCHA) and Hockey East each had three teams receive a berth in the tournament, while the ECAC had two berths.

Game locations
 East Regional – Centrum in Worcester, Worcester, Massachusetts
 West Regional – Dane County Coliseum, Madison, Wisconsin
 Frozen Four – Providence Civic Center, Providence, Rhode Island

Tournament bracket

Note: * denotes overtime period(s)

Regional Quarterfinals

East Regional

(3) New Hampshire vs. (6) Denver

(4) Clarkson vs. (5) Lake Superior State

West Regional

(3) Minnesota vs. (6) Rensselaer

(4) Wisconsin vs. (5) Michigan State

Regional semifinals

East Regional

(1) Boston University vs. (5) Lake Superior State

(2) Maine vs. (6) Denver

West Regional

(1) Michigan vs. (4) Wisconsin

(2) Colorado College vs. (3) Minnesota

Frozen Four

National semifinal

(E1) Boston University vs. (W3) Minnesota

(E2) Maine vs. (W1) Michigan

National Championship

(E1) Boston University vs. (E2) Maine

All-Tournament team
G: Blair Allison (Maine)
D: Chris Imes (Maine)
D: Kaj Linna (Boston University)
F: Shawn Bates (Boston University)
F: Chris O'Sullivan* (Boston University)
F: Dan Shermerhorn (Maine)
* Most Outstanding Player(s)

Record by conference

References

Tournament
NCAA Division I men's ice hockey tournament
NCAA Division I men's ice hockey tournament
NCAA Division I men's ice hockey tournament
NCAA Division I men's ice hockey tournament
NCAA Division I men's ice hockey tournament
NCAA Division I men's ice hockey tournament
Ice hockey competitions in Worcester, Massachusetts
Ice hockey competitions in Providence, Rhode Island
Ice hockey competitions in Michigan
Ice hockey competitions in Wisconsin
Sports in Madison, Wisconsin